Lawrence is a US-based soul-pop group founded by New York City-raised sibling duo Clyde and Gracie Lawrence, who have been singing, performing, and writing songs together since their early childhood. Today, Lawrence is an eight-piece band that has released three studio albums, plus several live and acoustic albums.

In July 2021, Lawrence released their album, Hotel TV, and became the first band to release music under Beautiful Mind Records, the label of Grammy-winning producer/songwriter/artist Jon Bellion, who co-produced and co-wrote the songs on the album along with Clyde, Gracie and their bandmates Jordan Cohen and Jonny Koh. Most recently, the album's lead single, "Don't Lose Sight," was featured in an international Microsoft commercial, which propelled it into the Top 20 on the USA Shazam Pop Charts. The single also hit #33 on Top 40 radio and was played on over 100 multi-format stations across the country. The band performed "Don't Lose Sight" on Jimmy Kimmel Live!, did a performance of it for The Late Show with Stephen Colbert, and closed both of their sets at Coachella with it.

Touring has been a key component of the group's rise to success: The release of Hotel TV was supported by the Hotel TV Tour, a 53-city tour across major cities in North America, including sold out shows at Terminal 5 in New York City, House of Blues in Chicago, and two nights at the Royale in Boston, among others. Following that, the band completed a co-headline tour with MisterWives. The group has toured with acts such as Lake Street Dive, Vulfpeck, Jon Bellion, Jacob Collier, Soulive, O.A.R., and Bernhoft, and has appeared at major festivals including Coachella, Bonnaroo, Outside Lands, Firefly, Okeechobee, Hangout, and Summerfest.

Lawrence family
Clyde and Gracie Lawrence, siblings aged three and a half years apart, have created music and performed together since childhood. Their father, Marc Lawrence, is a filmmaker, screenwriter, and director, best known for movies such as Miss Congeniality and Music and Lyrics. Their younger brother, Linus has also featured in songs such as "Come On, Brother" on their album Breakfast. He has also appeared in Lawrence music videos.

Clyde Lawrence

Clyde is a singer, pianist, and songwriter. He began writing music soon after he started playing the piano at age 4. In the band he plays guitar, organ, and keyboard. He graduated from the Dalton School in 2011 and completed an undergraduate degree at Brown University in 2015.

When Marc Lawrence was working on the 2000 film Miss Congeniality and was not pleased with his options for the Miss United States pageant theme song, he turned to Clyde to see what he thought was wrong. At only 5, Clyde wrote his own version, and the film's other producers chose it without knowing its writer. The Miss United States pageant anthem that Clyde composed is prominently featured in the film, and his composition led him to become the youngest member of the Songwriters Guild of America. 

While attending high school at Dalton, Clyde continued to compose music for major motion pictures. He wrote parts of the original score for the 2007 film Music & Lyrics as well as "Dance With Me Tonight", a song that Hugh Grant performs. He wrote two tracks, one of which he performed himself, for 2009 movie Did You Hear About the Morgans? Clyde has written songs for additional films including The Rewrite (2015) and Landline (2017). He also composed the songs featured in the Season 2 episode of Instinct entitled "Broken Record" which aired on July 7, 2019. Clyde, along with Cody Fitzgerald, composed the entire score for the 2019 Disney+ film, Noelle, starring Bill Hader and Anna Kendrick.

Gracie Lawrence
Gracie is a singer and actress. She attended Dalton School, graduating in 2015. She attended Brown after taking a gap year to tour with the band. Gracie was set to graduate from Brown in 2020 but has since left college to play with Lawrence full time.

Beyond music, she has acted on Broadway, television, and films for over a decade. In 2009, she acted in the Broadway show Brighton Beach Memoirs and also played Lucy Granger in the film Did You Hear About The Morgans?. She has also acted in the 2011 film The Sitter as well as TV shows such as The Good Wife, The Americans, Younger, and Billions. In 2018, she played Julie Gardner on the main cast of thriller CBS-All Access series One Dollar, which also featured Leslie Odom Jr. and John Carroll Lynch. She was featured in Town & Country magazine's "Modern Swans" September 2018 issue.

Band formation
While studying at Brown University, Clyde started a band originally called The Clyde Lawrence Band for which he sang lead vocals and played keyboard. The band featured a rotating crew of Brown students as members. Gracie, still in high school, also travelled to perform with the band. The Clyde Lawrence Band played events on campus as well as at colleges and venues across the Northeast.

The Clyde Lawrence Band performed on Clyde's 2013 album, Homesick. When Gracie became co-lead singer after many years playing together the band's name was changed to Lawrence.

Seven of the eight members of Lawrence attended Brown.

Music
Lawrence released its first full-length album, Breakfast, in 2016, which reached #6 on the iTunes R&B charts on its first day of release. Produced by Grammy winner Eric Krasno, Breakfast includes musical appearances from members of Snarky Puppy and Lettuce.

Their sophomore album, Living Room, was released in September 2018. Living Room reached #2 on the iTunes R&B/Soul chart, earned a featured placement on Spotify's "New Music Friday" playlist, and led the band to its late-night television debut on NBC's Last Call with Carson Daly. The album, which combines elements of Lawrence's old and new influences while featuring themes of childhood and family issues, was co-produced by bandmates Jordan Cohen (tenor/baritone saxophone) and Jonny Koh (guitar), Brooklyn-based producer Eli Crews, and Clyde and Gracie themselves.

Jon Bellion collaboration and record deal
In February 2019, Lawrence announced via social media that the band would be an opener for Jon Bellion on his summer 2019 national tour, the Glory Sound Prep Tour. In June, Lawrence released its first of many Jon Bellion-produced singles, "Casualty". In July, Bellion and Lawrence announced that Bellion had launched his own record label, Beautiful Mind Records and had signed Lawrence as its first artist. Bellion has stated that his intention with this new label is to "take care of artists for the rest of their careers" and to create a family of musical creators who he supports and with whom he collaborates.

Band members
 Gracie Lawrence – lead vocals, tambourine
 Clyde Lawrence – lead vocals, keyboards
 Sam Askin – drums
 Sumner Becker – alto saxophone
 Jordan Cohen – tenor saxophone, baritone saxophone, background vocals
 Michael Karsh – bass, background vocals
 Jonny Koh – guitar, background vocals
 Marc Langer – trumpet, rapping

Discography

Studio albums
 Homesick (EP) (2013)
 Breakfast (2016)
 Breakfast: Unscrambled (Acoustic Sessions) (2018)
 Living Room (2018)
 The Live Album (Part 1) (2020)
 The Live Album (Part 2) (2021)
 Hotel TV (2021)

Singles
 "Do You Wanna Do Nothing With Me?" (2017)
 "Misty Morning" (2017)
 "Probably Up" (2018)
 "Make A Move" (2018)
 "Casualty" (2019)
 "Casualty" (Acoustic) (2019)
 "It's Not All About You" (2019)
 "The Weather" (2020)
 "Quarantined With You" (2020)
 "Freckles" (2020)
 "Freckles (Live in LA)" (2020)
 "Don't Lose Sight" (2021)
 "False Alarms" (with Jon Bellion) (2021)

References

External links

2013 establishments in New York City
Musical groups established in 2013
Musical groups from New York City
Sibling musical groups
American soul musical groups
American funk musical groups